Rolf Wienk (Ede, 3 July 1991), known by his stage name as Rolf Sanchez, is a Dominican-Dutch singer, born from a Dominican mother and a Dutch father.

Career
In 2011 Sanchez took part in the fourth season of the Dutch version of television show X Factor, where he took third place. Despite not finishing first, he still received a record deal. In the same year his debut single Ave Maria, a Spanish-language cover by David Bisbal, was released. In 2013, the singer went to the Dominican Republic to focus on Spanish-language songs. He has achieved three number one songs on the Billboard Tropical Airplay chart with  "Por Si No Te Vuelvo a Ver", "Que Se Siente", and "Vas a Entender".  He was nominated for "Best New Artist" at the 2015 Premios Juventud Awards and New Artist of the Year at the 2016 Lo Nuestro Awards.

Sanchez appeared in 2019 in the Dutch singing program Beste Zangers. Here he sang the song Pa Olvidarte together with Emma Heesters. The song was well received and reached second place in both the Dutch Top 40 and in the Single Top 100. He was also seen that same year as an actor, playing the role of 'Carlos' in the film Verliefd op Cuba.

In August 2020 he reached the number one spot in the Dutch Top 40 with the single "Más más más".

Discography
Albums
 Mi viaje (2022) – No. 2 Netherlands

References

Dutch pop singers
Dutch people of Dominican Republic descent
Salsa musicians
1991 births
Living people
Spanish-language singers of the Netherlands
People from Ede, Netherlands